Nawabzada Tariq Magsi is a Pakistani politician who is the current Provincial Minister of Balochistan for Communication and Works, in office since 30 August 2018. He has been a member of the Provincial Assembly of Balochistan, since August 2018. Previously he was a Member of the Provincial Assembly of Balochistan from August 2013 to May 2018.

Early life and education
He was born on 8 September 1954 in Jhal Magsi District.

He has a degree in Bachelor of Arts.

He is brother of Mir Zulfiqar Ali Khan Magsi.

Political career

He was elected to the National Assembly of Pakistan from Constituency NA-201 in 1988 Pakistani general election.

He was elected to the Senate of Pakistan in 1990 where he remained as a Senator until 1996.

He was elected to the Provincial Assembly of Balochistan as a candidate of Pakistan Muslim League (Q) from Constituency PB 32-Kachi III in 2002 Pakistani general election.

He was re-elected to the Provincial Assembly of Balochistan as an independent candidate from Constituency PB-32 (Jhal Magsi Old Kacchi-III) in 2008 Pakistani general election.

In December 2012, he was appointed as leader of the opposition in the Provincial Balochistan Assembly.

He was re-elected to the Provincial Assembly of Balochistan as an independent candidate from Constituency PB-32 Jhal Magsi in by-election held in August 2013.

He was re-elected to the Provincial Assembly of Balochistan as a candidate of Balochistan Awami Party (BAP) from Constituency PB-16 (Jhal Magsi-cum-Kachhi) in 2018 Pakistani general election.

On 27 August 2018, he was inducted into the provincial Balochistan cabinet of Chief Minister Jam Kamal Khan. On 30 August, he was appointed as Provincial Minister of Balochistan for communication and works.

References

Living people
Balochistan MPAs 2013–2018
1954 births
Pakistani MNAs 1988–1990
Balochistan MPAs 2002–2007
Balochistan MPAs 2008–2013
Balochistan Awami Party MPAs (Balochistan)
Provincial ministers of Balochistan
Tariq